Colleen Anne Lanné (born August 18, 1979) is an American former competition swimmer who represented the United States in the Olympics, FINA world championships and Pan American Games.  She competed internationally in freestyle swimming events.

Lanné qualified for the 2004 U.S. Olympic team in the 4×100-meter freestyle relay after finishing sixth in the 100-meter freestyle at the 2004 U.S. Olympic Trials.  She earned a silver medal at the 2004 Summer Olympics in Athens, by swimming for the second-place U.S. team in the preliminary heats of the women's 4×100-meter freestyle relay.

In 2002 Lanne' was a silver medalist in the 4×200-meter freestyle relay at the Short Course World Championships.  She won a silver in the 200-meter freestyle, as well as gold medals in the 4×100-meter and 4×200-meter freestyle relays at the 2003 Pan American Games.

Lanné attended the University of Texas at Austin, where she swam for the Texas Longhorns swimming and diving team.

See also
 List of Olympic medalists in swimming (women)
 List of University of Texas at Austin alumni
 List of World Aquatics Championships medalists in swimming (women)

Notes

External links
 
 
 

1979 births
Living people
American female freestyle swimmers
Medalists at the 2004 Summer Olympics
Medalists at the FINA World Swimming Championships (25 m)
Olympic silver medalists for the United States in swimming
Pan American Games gold medalists for the United States
Pan American Games silver medalists for the United States
Sportspeople from Tucson, Arizona
Swimmers at the 2003 Pan American Games
Swimmers at the 2004 Summer Olympics
Texas Longhorns women's swimmers
World Aquatics Championships medalists in swimming
Pan American Games medalists in swimming
Medalists at the 2003 Pan American Games